Laurenz Berges (born Cloppenburg, 1966) is a German photographer. 
He graduated from the Kunstakademie Düsseldorf as Master Student under Bernd Becher in 1996. Berges' work is held in the collections of the Museum of Modern Art in New York and the San Francisco Museum of Modern Art.

Work 
Berges' photographic work focuses primarily on transience. Between 1991 and 1995, Berges photographed the interiors of East German barracks that had been abandoned by the Red Army after the collapse of the Soviet Union. In his book Etzweiler, Berges documented Etzweiler, the district of Elsdorf that had to make way for open-pit lignite mining. For years, the artist also photographed wastelands in the de-industrialized city of Duisburg. Berges finds his subjects in the urban gray areas: It is details from abandoned apartments, vacated houses, and overgrown gardens that interest him and that he makes the subject of a poetic, yet strictly documentary pictorial composition. In view of these photographs from the no-man's land between use and decay, recent past and foreseeable future, one could almost speak of photographic Arte Povera.

Publications

Books of work by Berges
Fotografien 1991–1995. Schirmer/Mosel, 2000. . With a text by Ulrich Bischoff.
Etzweiler. Schirmer/Mosel, 2005. . With a text by Michael Lentz.
Frühauf – Danach. Schirmer/Mosel, 2011. . With a text by Thomas Weski.
Cloppenburg. Kunstkreis, 2010. Edited by Barbara Hofmann-Johnson. . Texts in English and German.

Publications with contributions by Berges
The Düsseldorf School of Photography. New York: Aperture, 2010. Germany: Schirmer/Mosel, 2010. Edited by Stefan Gronert. Includes work by Bernd and Hilla Becher, Berges, Elger Esser, Andreas Gursky, Candida Höfer, Axel Hütte, Simone Nieweg, Thomas Ruff, Jörg Sasse, Thomas Struth, and Petra Wunderlich; a foreword by Lothar Schirmer, an essay by Gronert, and summary biographies, exhibition lists and bibliographies for each of the photographers. .

Collections
Berges' work is held in the following public collections:
Museum of Modern Art, New York: 2 prints (as of December 2020)
San Francisco Museum of Modern Art, San Francisco, California: 2 prints (as of December 2020)

References

External links

20th-century German photographers
21st-century German photographers
Kunstakademie Düsseldorf alumni
University of Duisburg-Essen alumni
People from Cloppenburg
Living people
1966 births